Otgontenger ("youngest sky") is the highest peak in the Khangai Mountains in Mongolia. Its summit is currently calculated to reach an elevation of 4,008 meters above mean sea level (some earlier topographic maps record a maximum elevation of 4,021 m). The mountain is located in Zavkhan Province and is the only peak in the Khangai range that is capped with a permanent glacier. The south face of Mount Otgontenger is the most extensive granite wall in Mongolia. 

Since the introduction of Buddhism, traditional Mongolian beliefs have held that wrathful deities inhabit many of Mongolia's sacred mountains. Ochirvaani is particularly associated with Otgontenger.

Accidents 
In August 1963, an Ilyushin 14 aircraft crashed into the side of the mountain while on route.

In October 2017, 27 hikers climbed the mountain and only 10 of them came back. They requested the rescue team a day after the other 17 went missing. The rescue operation took about 4 days with helicopters and 250 men.  Rescuers found all 17 of them dead, having received injuries from both fall damage and from frostbite. However, it was still argued that some of the victims survived the fall and tried to send distress signals by using flashlights.

See also 
 List of mountains in Mongolia
 List of Ultras of Central Asia

References

External links 
 "Otgon Tenger Uul, Mongolia" on Peakbagger
 www.summitpost.org/otgon-tenger-uul summitpost/otgon tenger

Mountains of Mongolia
Zavkhan Province
Four-thousanders of Asia
Tengriism